The Dream Within a Dream Tour was the fourth concert tour by American entertainer Britney Spears. It was launched in support of her third studio album, Britney (2001). The tour was promoted by Concerts West, marking the first time Spears did not tour with Clear Channel Entertainment. On September 21, 2001, a North American tour was announced that kicked off exactly two months later after various dates were postponed. In February 2002, Spears announced a second leg of the tour. It was directed and choreographed by Wade Robson, who explained the main theme of the show was Spears's coming of age and newfound independence. The stage was designed by Steve Cohen and Rob Brenner and was composed of a main stage and a B-stage, united by a runway. Inspired by Cleopatra's barge, a flying device was developed so Spears could travel over the audience to the B-stage. The setlist was mostly composed by songs from the supporting album, as Spears felt they were more reflective of her personality. Songs from her previous two studio albums were also included in remixed form by Robson.

The show was divided into seven segments with the last one being the encore. Spears opened the show hanging from a gyrating wheel; it continued with Spears performing a medley of older hits, jumping in bungee cords from the flying device onto the stage and dancing in a jungle setting. Most of the performances were accompanied by extravagant special effects, including confetti, pyrotechnics, laser lights, and artificial fog and snow. In the encore, there was a water screen that pumped two tons of water into the stage; this was considered one of the signature performances of the tour. During the 2002 leg, some changes were made; several songs were remixed, and Spears premiered various unreleased songs which included "Mystic Man". The show received acclaim from critics, who praised the show for being innovative and entertaining, while some dismissed it for taking the attention away from the music.

According to Billboard, the 2001–02 dates in North America had an average of $803,683 in gross and 14,344 in attendance, bringing a total gross of $53,846,761 and 961,048 tickets sold in 66 shows, not including the Japanese sold-out show at Tokyo Dome in Tokyo for 60,000 fans. Overall, the Dream Within a Dream Tour grossed $56.8 million and sold more than 1 million of tickets in 68 shows. On July 27, 2002, Spears performed for 51,261 fans at Foro Sol stadium in Mexico City. The show grossed $2,251,379 and was the 37th on Pollstars Top 200 Concert Grosses in North America. During the second show in Mexico, Spears left the stage after the sixth song due to a lightning storm; the show was canceled and angered the audience. The tour was broadcast live on an HBO special on November 18, 2001, and went on to win an Emmy for Outstanding Technical Direction on the 2002 ceremony. A DVD titled Britney Spears Live from Las Vegas was released in January 2002.

Background

On July 19, 2001, Spears's band announced there would be a tour to support her third studio album, Britney (2001). The following day, Spears's label Jive Records confirmed that there was a tour planned for the fall. The Dream Within a Dream Tour was promoted by Concerts West, chosen after a much publicized battle with concert promoter Clear Channel Entertainment (CCE), who had handled her previous concert tours. It marked the first time Concerts West outbid CCE, with reports claiming Spears would earn between $13 and $15 million during the tour. Spears's manager Larry Rudolph commented on the situation, saying,
"Clear Channel is an incredible company, and I'm sure we'll be doing more business with them. We went with Concerts West because they're a strong touring company and because they have ancillary properties, in that [parent AEG owns] arenas and some 7,000 movie theaters throughout the country. This decision was not made to exclude Clear Channel. It was made to include Concerts West. [AEG] has the ability to help us market our core products—the album and tour—and our secondary properties—the movie— in ways that tipped the scale for us."
On September 20, 2001, dates were released along with the track listing of the album. The tour was slated to begin on October 26, 2001, but the opening of the show was pushed back until October 31 after Spears became ill and was prescribed five days of rest. The tour was postponed one more day due to production delays and finally kicked off at Nationwide Arena in Columbus, Ohio. Before the tour began, Spears announced she planned to give $1 of each ticket to the children of firefighters and police officers killed during the September 11 attacks. She also planned to sell merchandise and auction front row seats, hoping to raise $2 million. On February 26, 2002, more North American dates were released through her official website to kick off in Las Vegas at Mandalay Bay. The second leg of the tour was sponsored by Samsung. In conjunction with entertainment company WFX, they offered  a cell-phone service that featured collectible merchandise and a membership card with access to backstage reports directly from Spears. She stated that "[the offering] is an exciting new way for me to stay connected with my fans".

Development

The name of the tour was based on Edgar Allan Poe's poem of the same name. The tour was directed and choreographed by Australian choreographer Wade Robson. He explained the concept of the tour, saying,
"The show is gonna be really, really theatrical—it's really complicated. It's a massive show with a lot of new music. It's just gonna be really different. [...] You're gonna learn a lot more about her as a person. The show is gonna be really about how she's becoming a woman, how she's finding herself and her independence. She knows what she wants to do, she knows who she wants to be, and that's what the show's about."
The stage was designed by production designer Steven Cohen and production manager Rob Brenner for the HBO special. This was the first time Spears used an entire new stage design after having used a typical end-stage with a ramp and stairs at the center as on her first 3 tours (the ...Baby One More Time Tour, the (You Drive Me) Crazy Tour, and the Oops!... I Did It Again Tour). Cohen designed the main stage with an oval shape so that Spears could perform around the stage and so that it would look good from multiple camera angles. He said that the rest of the stage was created with three main components in mind: a runway, a B-stage, and a flying device over the crowd. The last was developed, as explained by Cohen, "around this Cleopatra's barge concept I got into my head while designing when the movie Cleopatra was playing in the background. It needed to be elegant and stylized but also high tech, because it was going to have to be traveling on conventional motors and transport mechanisms. Plus, it had to have a big enough performance area for her and the dancers." Brenner continued, "I wanted to try to give the kid in the back of the house the same experience as the one in the first 10 rows." The runway uniting the main stage and the B-stage was suggested by one of Spears's managers, Johnny Wright. The entire stage was built by Michael Tait from Tait Towers. Cohen said, "We took a more expanded role in preparing the drawings for Michael. We wanted to retain the essence of the look of the show, both in its overall footprint and in the execution of these various pieces. [...] [He] did a great job on executing the fine details like the hand railings and the floor lights and the MR-16 covers. When you're doing something for TV, all of those pieces are foreground pieces. The mirrors on the platforms and the floor painting made the show look better on TV."

The video screens showed both live shoots and special footage directed by Robson. Cohen worked by Danny O'Brien at BCC Video to create double-sided custom video LED cubes that hanged above stage right. There were three larger-sized video screens above the stage area. The gyrating wheel in which Spears opened the show was made by Branam Enterprises and was attached to a platform also created by Tait Towers. 171 white light yag lasers were provided by Spectra. The giant music box from which Spears emerged in "Born to Make You Happy" (1999) was designed by Michael Cotton. Confetti was shot from machines provided by Pyrotek. Pyrotechnics were done by Gerb Fountains, whereas artificial snow was provided by Little Blizzard. During the encore performance of "...Baby One More Time" (1998), there was a water screen in which it was poured nearly two tons of water pumped at 360 gallons a minute. Cohen said, "The water screen is the keystone of the entire design because it impacts every system—electrics, staging, dancing. Rob discovered the company (Chameleon Productions of Orlando, Florida) that makes the screen, and I immediately looked at what they had in stock, which was a straight line. And I knew we didn't want a straight line. We wanted a circular water screen so we could physically build a shower for her to stand in the middle of and not get wet and then walk through when she wanted to. Of course, everyone thought I was crazy, so I suggested a six-sided shape. Everyone was concerned that the gaps between the sections might cause gaps in the actual sheets of water. But I kept saying that if you put them 40' to 50' up in the air, gravity will cause the water to attach to itself, so you end up getting a solid sheet."

The lighting was designed by Cohen and his partner in Steve Cohen Productions, Joel Young, who served as the tour's lighting director. Cohen continued saying, "All of our shows [are] heavily color-based—everything is rich in color. There is a lot of layering that is not confusing so the purity comes through". Young programmed the show on a Flying Pig Systems Wholehog II console, which he ran while simultaneously calling the 13 followspots for each show. There were eight truss spots and five house spots: four Lycian 2.5 kW instruments on the back, four Robert Juliats on the front truss, four FOH spots and one in the back." Steve Cohen Productions also served as the tour's lighting vendor and sublet the gear they required from Westsun and Fourth Phase/LSD. Syncrolite provided its own 3k lights. Apart from the Syncrolites, the rest of the lighting was a combination of Coemar and High End Systems automated fixtures and conventional luminaries. There were a total of 215 active lights.

A week before the tour began, Spears said of the show: "I come from Broadway, so I want it to be very theatrical. The whole process for me is magical. Hopefully it will be something people have never even imagined or envisioned in their head. I was going through a run-through yesterday and was thinking, 'By the time I'm 30, there's not going to be anything left for me to do'". Initial rehearsals for the band started on September 9, 2001. She joined them later after rehearsing the choreography in Los Angeles.  The setlist was composed mostly by songs from Britney. She explained her decision in a press conference, saying, "I just want my fans to see me in a different light than they have ever seen me [in] before. This music I am singing right now is such a reflection of me and who I am. Hopefully [the fans] will come to the show and be inspired and have a lot of fun." Several songs from her previous albums ...Baby One More Time and Oops!... I Did It Again were remixed by Robson to "take [them] in a new direction – flip [them] up a bit".

Concert synopsis

The show began with a woman dressed in an 18th-century white nightgown who talked to the audience briefly before disappearing. There was a video introduction in which different people told their dreams. At the end of the video, Spears appeared sleeping in a bubble. A platform with a wheel attached rose several feet above the ground, and she appeared strapped to it while wearing a black ensemble. She started rotating in a similar way to a target girl while starting to perform "Oops!...I Did It Again" with her dancers. "(You Drive Me) Crazy" was performed next with Spears captured by her dancers. She left the stage for a costume change while her dancers performed. "Overprotected" was performed next with Spears (dressed in a futuristic version of one of Elvis Presley's jumpsuit) surrounded by laser lights. The video backdrop showed images of a bald Spears, with her hair growing as the song went along. The next section began with an interlude of actor Jon Voight, portraying the singer's father, telling a story to a young Spears, played by Ashley Edner, before a giant musical box was raised, and Spears emerged from the middle as a ballerina to perform "Born To Make You Happy". She tore off her tutu and put on a long white satin cote to perform "Lucky" while confetti was shot. The medley ended with a performance of "Sometimes" for which she donned a bathrobe.

She returned to the stage wearing a tank top with glittery tomboy looking suspenders and pants for a dance-oriented performance of "Boys". The show continued with "Stronger", in which she wore a paint-covered robe and in some shows a bowler hat. At the end of the performance, she sat down next to a piano player and talked to the audience before moving into a performance of "I'm Not A Girl, Not Yet A Woman". A video interlude spoofing Making the Band-type shows followed, showing Spears and her dancers as a struggling band. She took the stage again in a barge (wearing a black, silver, and gray rock star style jacket and green pants) along with four female dancers to perform "I Love Rock 'n' Roll". The barge was lifted by wires, but pyrotechnics below it made it seem as if it was lifted by fire. When it was above the B-stage, Spears jumped to it with bungee cords. There was a skit in which her dancers chased her, before Spears loses the rock star jacket revealing a glittery red and purple halter top for a performance of "What It's Like To Be Me" in the small stage. She returned to the main stage for a performance of "Lonely", in which she danced to a video projection of herself. The dancers and the band performed the "Breakdown" interlude. In "Don't Let Me Be the Last to Know", she sang on an elevated platform wearing a white evening gown, while two of her dancers performed a routine. Artificial snow fell from the ceiling during the performance.

After a brief interlude, she returned for a performance of "Anticipating" where she wore a patched denim skirt. The set was made of giant coloring book drawings of houses and cars. She took out the costume to reveal a green top and small brown skirt for "I'm a Slave 4 U" in a jungle setting while surrounded by artificial fog and laser lights. After the song ended, she bowed and thanked the audience before exiting the stage. The encore began with a giant projection of a hologram of Spears onto a water screen. The projection gradually shrunk until Spears rose from the stage while wearing a plastic cowboy hat, blue hip-huggers, and a matching bra top. She began performing "...Baby One More Time" in a ballad version until reaching the end of the runway. Pyrotechnics surrounded the stage while the song changed to a more uptempo version with elements of techno. Her dancers took the main stage while she returned to it running through the runway. They jumped on the barge while it was lifted into the air and continued to dance. At the end, Spears jumped off the barge with the bungee cords and landed in the main stage and descended from it.

After the announcement of the 2002 extension of the tour, some changes were made to the setlist. The original mix of "Overprotected" was replaced by the Darkchild remix of the song. "Boys" was replaced by the remix featuring Pharrell while Spears replaced the outfit with tomboy suspenders for a black leather top. A new song called "Mystic Man" was added after "Stronger". It was described by Corey Moss of MTV as "similar to ["I'm Not a Girl, Not Yet a Woman"], but with a bit more traditional R&B flair, a la Alicia Keys". The song was often replaced with other new songs throughout the tour. Some other changes were also made; the video screens did not have such a prominent role, and the backdrops of "Overprotected" were taken out.

Reception

Larry Nager of The National Enquirer commented that "[the concert] packed more technical wizardry than Harry Potter, but almost no actual singing". He summarized his review saying "If it wasn't quite a real concert, it was a great show." Ann Powers of The New York Times said the show was "dazzling" and commented that the performance did not suffer from music being its least important element, adding "This dream extravaganza perhaps unwittingly suggested that the Britney we know is herself a dream, an artist whose genius is not for singing [...] but for teasing out the cravings and fears that haunt the modern world. Ms. Spears now wants to awaken to an adult persona, but she may find that the netherworld of desire is her natural home." Jim Farber of the New York Daily News compared it to tours of other teenage artists, saying "her latest 90-minute extravaganza had to be the costliest, most elaborate and, to be honest, least tacky to date". He was also impressed with the stage, calling it "the largest proscenium I've ever seen at a pop show." Camille Lamb of The Daily Collegian named the show "an elaborate, highly homogenized display of capitalism at its finest". She also said the show fulfilled its expectations, saying "[it brought] a teenage fantasy to a tangible reality."

Neva Chonin of the San Francisco Chronicle believed the show "was pure Britney excess, [...] hugely entertaining" and added that "while it's all too easy to deride Spears' contrivances from a distance, in person there's no denying her charisma or her archetypal appeal. She's like a refugee from David Lynch's Mulholland Drive, a gleaming dream cipher waiting to be filled with an audience's fantasies. And she works that role with flawless professionalism, punctuating her choreographed moves with an amiable accessibility that drew fans into her airtight world even as it kept them at a safe distance. In short, she connected—through smiles, giggles and what seemed to be genuine pleasure in performing." While reviewing the Femme Fatale Tour in 2011, Jim Harrington of the Oakland Tribune deemed the show as "one of the best pop music productions I’ve ever witnessed."

Lubbock and Mexico cancellations
The show on June 14, 2002 at the United Spirit Arena in Lubbock, Texas was cancelled due to a transformer blowing out during the 2nd song which put the whole show on auxiliary power making it unsafe for Spears and the entire production team to continue. The show initially was going to be rescheduled according to the band member and DJ, Skip, but it later fell through.

On July 28, 2002, during the second concert at Foro Sol in Mexico City, Spears left the stage after the performance of "Stronger" while saying, "I'm sorry, Mexico. I love you, bye."  Shortly after, an announcement was made through the speakers confirming the show was cancelled. According to local newspapers Milenio and El Universal, fans screamed "Fraud!", booed and hurled chairs and other items. Two days later, a statement was released by Spears that said: "I'm sorry I couldn't finish the show for my fans. The Mexican fans are one of the best audiences to play for. We decided that we had no choice but to cancel the show after the storm and lightning showed no signs of clearing up." Concert promoter Ocesa Presenta director Guillermo Parra explained to El Universal that "there was no trick nor deceit, but climatic conditions cannot be controlled". It was announced that fans could receive a full refund starting on August 1, 2002. Jive Records released a statement saying,
"A hazardous lightning storm made it essential for Spears to depart the stage. Spears began the show during a break between two rainstorms, but the degree of risk to the audience and stage crew associated with the second storm, an electrical storm, made it impossible for the show to continue."

Broadcasts and recordings

On March 1, 2001, HBO announced that a Las Vegas show at MGM Grand Arena would be broadcast on November 18, 2001. The special was directed and produced by Marty Callner. Spears requested that HBO aired the concert to the American Forces Network (AFN) on its AFN-Atlantic and AFN-Pacific channels at no cost. She also interacted with soldiers based at Marine Corps Base Camp Pendleton, Naval Base San Diego, Fort Polk, and Lackland Air Force Base. The special won an Emmy for Outstanding Technical Direction on the 2002 ceremony. In January 2002, Jive Records released the DVD Britney Spears Live from Las Vegas; it was certified two-times platinum by the Recording Industry Association of America (RIAA) for shipment of 200,000 copies in units. On September 18, 2002, Jive Records announced the release of a photographic book and DVD titled Stages and  Stages: Three Days in Mexico. The DVD was directed by Albert Maysles and chronicled her stay in Mexico and Japan. Spears explained the release, saying, "I wanted to share with my fans all the things that they never get to see that make it all so special for me. It's my way of saying thank you."

Set lists

The following is from the November 1, 2001, show in Columbus. It is not intended to represent all dates throughout the tour.

"Dream Within a Dream" 
"Oops!... I Did It Again"
"(You Drive Me) Crazy"
"It Was All in Your Mind" 
"Overprotected" 
"Storytime"  
"Born to Make You Happy"
"Lucky"
"Sometimes"
"Storytime (Reprise)" 
"Boys"
"Stronger"
"I'm Not a Girl, Not Yet a Woman"
"Making the Band" 
"I Love Rock 'n' Roll"
"What It's Like to Be Me"
"Lonely"
"Breakdown" 
"Don't Let Me Be the Last to Know"
"Crayola World" 
"Anticipating"
"I'm a Slave 4 U"
Encore
"...Baby One More Time"
"It Was Just a Dream" 

The following set list is from the show in May 25, 2002, show in Las Vegas. It is not intended to represent all dates throughout the tour.

“Dream Within a Dream” 
"Oops!... I Did It Again"
"(You Drive Me) Crazy"
"It Was All in Your Mind" 
"Overprotected" (The Darkchild Remix)
"Storytime"  
"Born to Make You Happy"
"Lucky"
"Sometimes"
"Storytime (Reprise)" 
"Boys" (The Co-Ed Remix)
"Stronger"
"Mystic Man" (contains excerpts from "Gone")
"I'm Not a Girl, Not Yet a Woman"
“Making the Band" 
"I Love Rock 'n' Roll"
"What It's Like to Be Me"
"Lonely"
"Breakdown" 
"Don't Let Me Be the Last to Know"
"Crayola World" 
"Anticipating"
"I'm a Slave 4 U"
Encore
"...Baby One More Time"
"It Was Just a Dream" 

"Weakness" replaced "Mystic Man" during shows in Vancouver, Houston, Hamilton, Worcester, and Sunrise, as well as the third Los Angeles show.
"You Were My Home" replaced "Mystic Man" during the shows in Tacoma, Phoenix, Chicago, Bossier City, and Dallas, and the second shows in Philadelphia and Atlantic City.
"My Love Was Always There" replaced "Mystic Man" for shows in Indianapolis, Buffalo, and Oklahoma City, as well as the second shows in Los Angeles and East Rutherford, and the third show in Boston.
During the show in Charlotte, Spears performed "Happy Birthday" to her dancer Nancy Anderson. Additionally, "Mystic Man" was replaced by "Weakness".

Shows

Personnel

 Production, set and lighting designer – Steve Cohen
 Set designer – Jim Day
 Lighting designer and director – Joel Young
 Production manager – Rob Brenner
 Show director – Wade Robson
 Tour manager – Richard Channer
 Production coordinator – Dawn Brenner
 Production assistant – Andre Morales
 Pyrotechnic and special effects designer – Doug Adams
 Master electrician – Henry Wetzel
 Head carpenter – James McKinney
 Carpenters – Dewey Evans, Barney Quinn, Mike Thonus, Curtis Gilbert, Brian Bassham, & Dennis Sutton (water screen)
 Water screen technician – Bob Pratt
 Lead rigger – Mark Ward
 Advance riggers – Bill Rengstl, Bobby Savage
 Riggers – Dan Savage, Gabriel Wood, Bill Rengstl
 Branam fly riggers – James Stratton, Dave Lowman, Billy Ferrie, Joey Dickey, & Bjorn Melchert
 Lighting crew chief – Pat Bannon
 Lighting technicians – Jason Bridges, Jeff Gregos, Jeff Crocker, Mike Parker, Dustin Mansell, Marcello Cacciagioni, Madison Wade, & Steve Sligar
 Pyro technicians – Keith Hellebrand, Mike Green and John Taylor
 Laser technicians – John Popwycz & Gordon Hum
 Video director – Mark Haney
 Video engineer – Bob Larkin
 LED screen engineer – Kraig "Bundy" Boyd
 LED engineer/camera operator – Phil Evans
 Projectors/camera operator – Keith Lockette
 Camera operator – Adrian Brister
 Projectors – Rick Popham
 FOH sound engineer – Monty Lee Wilkes
 Monitor engineer – Raza Sufi
 Audio system engineer – James Ragus
 Audio technicians – Jamison Hyatt, Paul White, & Daniel Sheehan, Jr.
 Stage manager – Sven Ladewig
 Backline Technicians – Marc Delcore (Digital Audio), Dan Weingartner (Keyboards), Andy Hindman (Drums & Guitars – 1st leg), Brian Saunders (Drums & Guitars – 2nd leg)
 Stage manager assistants – Ian Donald & Chris Wallman
 Set construction – Tait Towers; Michael Tait & Winky Fairorth
 Lighting vendor – Steve Cohen Productions
 Video vendor – BCC Video; Danny O'Bryen
 Rigging vendor – Branam Enterprises; Joe Branam
 Camera track support – Tomcat USA
 Audio vendor – Showco; ML Procise
 Water screen manufacturer – Chameleon Productions; John Markham
 Dancers  - James Cox, Angela Elgani (nee Randle), Andre Fuentes, Brooke Lipton, Nanci Anderson, Aminah Jillil, Gabriel Paige

Source:

Notes

References

External links
 

2001 concert tours
2002 concert tours
Britney Spears concert tours